Vaupés may refer to:
A branch of the Nadahup languages
The Vaupés language area